Tepetaşpınar is a village in Tarsus district of Mersin Province, Turkey. It is situated in the Toros Mountains. The population of village is 210  as of 2011.

References

Villages in Tarsus District